Statistics of International Soccer League II in season 1961.

League standings

Section I

Section II

Matches

Championship finals

First leg

Second leg 

Dukla Prague won 9–2 on aggregate.

References

 Series on "Pitch Invasion" by Tom Dunmore from 2011:
 Part 3: Expanded Dreamsn
 Part 4: Struggling Towards Orbit

International Soccer League seasons
International Soccer League, 1961